This list includes domestic and international destinations once served by Aeroperú, the flag carrier airline of Peru from 1973 to 1999. Besides a multitude of domestic routes, the network with its hub at Lima's Jorge Chavez International Airport spanned throughout Latin America. At times, cities in the United States were served, too, as well as regional routes out of El Dorado International Airport in Colombia.

References

Lists of airline destinations